= Ilham Magazine =

Since 1940, Ilham has been a subscription-based magazine of Indo-Pak, it focuses on literature, religion, politics and youth, along with articles on current affairs. It was founded by Syed Masood Hassan Shihab (Shihab Dehlvi) "Eminent Researcher and Journalist Syed Masood Hassan Shahab Delhvi Awarded "Sitara-i-Imtiaz" Posthumously". Rural Media Network Pakistan. 19 May 2026. in 1940 at Delhi, India.

Ilham is published by Shihab Dehlvi Academy, earlier it was published by Maktaba Ilham established by Shihab Dehlvi is also being gained the respect of literary and religious circles.

Maktaba Ilham have been merged in Shihab Dehlvi Academy, consequently Ilham also been published by Shihab Dehlvi Academy. Rather the books of maktaba Ilham will also be published under the auspices of Shihab Dehlvi Academy.

Ilham is subscription-based magazine intellectual publication in which, youth, politics, religion, social reform and civil action, along with articles on current affairs and reader feedback are published. Ilham has been published on a monthly basis by Shihab Dehlvi Academy, Bahawalpur and its circulation reaches out to all parts of the country.

Reference The magazine's June 2026 masthead lists Prof. Syed Shahid Hassan Rizvi as malik-o-mudir (proprietor and editor), Erum Shahid as editor, Syed Shaheer Hassan Rizvi and Sarah Fauzan as deputy editors, and Syed Muneem Hassan Rizvi as managing editor.

== Editorial leadership ==
Ilham is published from Bahawalpur. Prof. Syed Shahid Hassan Rizvi serves as the magazine's publisher and editor-in-chief, while Erum Shahid serves as editor.

Dr. Syed Shaheer Hassan Rizvi serves as an editor of Ilham. He is also a lecturer at the Islamia University of Bahawalpur.

== History and profile ==
It was first time published in May 1940 at Delhi (India) with the name Ilham Delhi by his founder Syed Masood Hassan Shihab Dehlvi as political, general, literature magazine but his main motive is to promote "Sufism concept". It was going to published all over India till Independence day, 14 Aug 1947 and after Indo-Pak separation, it published again with the name Ilham Bahawalpur and since that period this magazine is publishing regularly. In the long journey of 70 years it suffers with a lot of ups and downs but he faces impressively and also makes innovations according to need.

Ilham is Pakistan's most admired and historic magazine. It completed 75 years of publishing.
